Nakanai may be,

Nakanai Mountains
Nakanai language
Chalcolemia nakanai, sp. spider

See also
Nakanai to Kimeta Hi, Japanese TV drama